CaribVision is an international broadcast television channel that plays in the United States, the Caribbean and Canada. CaribVision is an internationally broadcast English-language television channel run by the Caribbean Media Corporation (CMC)'s national broadcast centre on the island of Barbados. The main focus of the channel is Caribbean culture, news, current affairs, sports, lifestyle, opinions, and entertainment from an Anglophone Caribbean perspective.

CaribVision is currently available in Latin America and over 30 Caribbean territories where it broadcasts to the Caribbean-diaspora. CaribVision appears in the United States and Canada.  It is available in the United States on Cablevision.

Programming 

 Caribbean News Review
 Caribbean Newsline
 Caribbean Today
 Riddim Express

Partners and affiliates 
 Caribbean Communications Network Ltd., (CCN-TV6) – Trinidad & Tobago
 Caribbean Broadcasting Corporation, (CBC-TV8) – Barbados
 Institute of Cuban Radio & Television, (ICRT) – Cuba
 ZNS Network – The Bahamas
 The Creative Production & Training Centre Ltd., (CPTC) – Jamaica
 Television Jamaica Ltd., (TVJ) – Jamaica
 CVM Television Ltd. – Jamaica
 Teleislas – Colombia

See also
 List of television stations in the Caribbean

References

External links

Caribbean Media Corporation - cmccaribbean.com - CaribVision - Channel description
CaribVision: Satellite broadcasting Information - Satellite Configuration information
Caribbean Net News: Launch of new CaribVision - 4 August 2006 - Caribbean Net News, Cayman Islands

Caribbean Media Corporation
Caribbean cable television networks
Television stations in Barbados
Television channels and stations established in 2006
English-language television stations